David William Oxtoby (born 1951) is an American academic who served as the ninth president of Pomona College. He held the position from July 1, 2003, to July 1, 2017. A theoretical chemist, he received his bachelor's degree in chemistry and physics at Harvard University (summa cum laude) and his PhD in chemistry in 1975 from the University of California, Berkeley. Prior to his appointment at Pomona College, he was the Dean of the Physical Sciences Division at the University of Chicago.

As a research chemist, Oxtoby is author or co-author of more than 158 scientific articles on subjects such as light scattering, chemical reaction dynamics and phase transitions. He has been invited as a guest lecturer at conferences and institutions around the globe and served as visiting professor at the University of Paris, the University of Bristol, and the University of Sydney. He also co-authored two popular textbooks in chemistry: Principles of Modern Chemistry and Chemistry: Science of Change. He has received fellowships from the Guggenheim, Alexander von Humboldt, Camille and Henry Dreyfus, Alfred P. Sloan, Danforth and National Science foundations.

Theoretical chemist David Tannor, who is the Hermann Mayer Professorial Chair in the Department of Chemical Physics at the Weizmann Institute of Science in Israel, did his post-doc work with Stuart Rice and David Oxtoby at the University of Chicago.

He is a fellow of the American Physical Society and a member of the American Chemical Society and the American Association for the Advancement of Science. In 2012, he was inducted into the American Academy of Arts and Sciences.

In February 2016, he announced his intention to step down as president in June 2017. G. Gabrielle Starr officially succeeded him on July 1, 2017.

In December 2018, the American Academy of Arts and Sciences announced that Oxtoby would serve as its 47th president, succeeding Jonathan Fanton. Oxtoby began his term in January 2019.

In 2020 he was elected to the American Philosophical Society.

References

External links

Pomona College: Office of the President

1951 births
Living people
William Penn Charter School alumni
Presidents of Pomona College
Harvard University alumni
University of Chicago faculty
Fellows of the American Academy of Arts and Sciences
Members of the American Philosophical Society
Fellows of the American Physical Society